104.7 Prime FM (DXEI 104.7 MHz) is an FM station owned and operated by Prime Broadcasting Network. Its studios and transmitter are located at Kidapawan.

References

External links
Prime FM Kidapawan FB Page

Radio stations in Cotabato
Radio stations established in 2017